Charles Dyer may refer to:

 Charles Dyer (architect) (1794–1848), British architect
 Charles E. Dyer (1834–1905), American federal judge
 Charles V. Dyer (1808–1878), American abolitionist

 Charles Dyer (playwright) (1928–2021), British playwright and actor, author of the play Staircase
 Charles A. Dyer, former U.S. Marine sergeant and Oath Keepers advocate now imprisoned for child rape